An underdog is a participant in a fight, conflict, or game who is not expected to win.

Underdog may also refer to:

Books
 Underdog (novel), a 2001 novel by Swedish author Torbjörn Flygt
 "The Underdog", a Hercule Poirot short story by Agatha Christie in the collection The Adventure of the Christmas Pudding
 The Underdog (novel), a 1999 children's novel by Markus Zusak
 Underdogs (anthology), a 2011 omnibus edition of Zusak's first three novels
 Topdog/Underdog, a 2002 play by Suzan-Lori Parks

Film and TV

Film
 Underdog (2007 film), a live-action film based on the 1964 TV cartoon series of the same name
 Underdogs (2013 Argentine film), a 2013 animated Argentine football film
 Underdogs (2013 American film), a 2013 high-school American football film
 Underdog (2018 film), a South Korean animated film
 The Underdog (1943 film), an American drama film

Television
 Underdog (TV series), an American animated television show
 The Underdog Show, a British dog-training show
 Underdogs (TV series), a Canadian consumer-advocacy show
 Underdogs, an Irish-language reality show on TG4
 "The Underdog", an Agatha Christie's Poirot episode

Music

Albums
 The Underdog (Aaron Watson album), 2015
 Underdog (Atlanta Rhythm Section album), 1979
 Underdog (Audio Adrenaline album), or the title song
 Underdog (Brutto album), or the title song
 The Underdog, an album by Stef Lang
 The Underdog EP, by Yellowcard, or the title song, "Underdog"
 The Underdog/El Subestimado, by Tego Calderón
 Underdogs (album), by the Matthew Good Band
 Underdogz EP, by the Axe Murder Boyz, or the title song
 Underdog, an upcoming album by Wee Bee Foolish
 Underdog, an album by Exilia
 Underdog: Original Soundtrack, the soundtrack album from the film

Songs
 "Underdog" (Alicia Keys song), 2020
 "Underdog" (Ida song), 2013
 "Underdog" (Kasabian song), 2009
 "Underdog" (You Me at Six song), 2010
 "Underdog" (Banks song), 2017
 "Underdogs" (song), a 2007 song by Manic Street Preachers
 "The Underdog" (song), by Spoon
 "Underdog", by Anastacia, the B-side of "Cowboys & Kisses"
 "Underdog", by Imagine Dragons from Night Visions
 "Underdog", by the Jonas Brothers from It's About Time
 "Underdog", by Lacuna Coil from Shallow Life
 "Underdog", by Lil Baby and Gunna from Drip Harder
 "Underdog", by The Lost Trailers
 "Underdog", by Motionless in White from Infamous
 "Underdog", by Rock Star Supernova from Rock Star Supernova
 "Underdog", by Sly & the Family Stone from A Whole New Thing
 "Underdog", by Testeagles from Non Comprehendus
 "Underdog (Save Me)", by Turin Brakes from The Optimist LP
 "The Underdog", by Reks from Rhythmatic Eternal King Supreme

Other music
 Underdog Records, a Chicago record label whose releases include Screeching Weasel
 Underdog, an American hardcore punk band with one release from Revelation Records
 Underdog Records, a French record label

Other
 Underdog (advertising character), featured on National Accident Helpline commercials
 Suzanne Muldowney (born 1952), American performance artist
 Haifa Underdogs, an American football club in the Israeli Football League
 Turnspit dog, a breed of dog also known as the Underdog
 Underdog Productions, an American animation studio
 FC Underdog Chist, a Belarusian football club based in Chist, Minsk Oblast

See also
 The Underdogs (disambiguation)